Aura is the second studio album by Puerto Rican reggaeton artist Ozuna. It was released on August 24, 2018 through VP Records, Dimelo VI Distribution and Sony Music Latin. It features collaborations with J Balvin, Akon, R.K.M & Ken-Y, Nicky Jam, Wisin & Yandel, Cardi B, and Romeo Santos. The album was preceded by the singles "La Modelo" and "Única", the latter of which is also remixed on the album in a version featuring Anuel AA and Wisin & Yandel.

In support of the album, Ozuna went on the 29-date Aura Tour across the United States, which began on September 7 in Atlanta.

Critical reception

Writing for Rolling Stone, Elias Leight called Aura "a step beyond the reggaeton and trap that Ozuna is known for" and highlighted several tracks that compare to the "insta-classics" from Odisea, saying "'Besos Mojados,' a collaboration with veterans RKM & Ken-Y on which Ken-Y threatens to out-sing Ozuna, and 'Ibiza,' which appears to get prettier every time it gets played. [... And t]rap-heads will be pleased with 'Pasado y Presente,' a magnetic collaboration with Latin trap forefather Anuel AA". In conclusion, Leight stated that "Aura has just one weakness — at 20 songs, it's more drawn out than it needs to be. But with an inventive singer like Ozuna at the helm, even when Aura drags, it never loses its buoyancy for long." The song was nominated for a Latin American Music Awards of 2019 in Favorite Urban Song category.f

Commercial performance
Aura debuted at number seven on the US Billboard 200 with 49,000 album-equivalent units (including 7,000 pure album sales). It is the biggest sales week of 2018 for a Latin album.

Track listing

Charts

Weekly charts

Year-end charts

Certifications

References

2018 albums
Ozuna (singer) albums